Kyle Catlett (born November 16, 2002) is an American child actor from Morristown, New Jersey.

Catlett has appeared in the television series The Following as "Joey Matthews". He made his feature film acting debut in a 2013 adventure drama film The Young and Prodigious T.S. Spivet, he played the eponymous lead role, directed by Jean-Pierre Jeunet. He starred in the remake Poltergeist (2015), as the middle child, Griffin Bowen.

Personal life
Aside from English, he also speaks Russian, Chinese and French plus a little bit of Spanish and Latin. He was taught Russian by his mother. He learned Chinese  in Chinese school once a week, and gave an interview in that language. He studied French since the film crew of The Young and Prodigious T.S. Spivet was mainly French.

Filmography

Films

Television

References

External links
 

Living people
Male actors from New Jersey
American male child actors
American male film actors
American male television actors
21st-century American male actors
2002 births